"Quickie" is a song by American recording artist Miguel. It was released as the third single from his 2010 debut album All I Want Is You, and was sent to rhythmic contemporary radio on August 2, 2011. The official remix features rapper Big Sean.

Music and lyrics
"Quickie" is an R&B song, according to The New York Times critic Jon Caramanica. It features a low-tempo, reggae-accented guitar and percussion instrumental produced by Fisticuffs, accompanying the earnest sexual propositions in Miguel's lyrics.

Charts

Weekly charts

Year-end charts

Certifications

References

2010 songs
2011 singles
Miguel (singer) songs
RCA Records singles
Songs written by Miguel (singer)